The Cry of the Black Wolves is a 1972 West German western adventure film directed by Harald Reinl and starring Ron Ely, Raimund Harmstorf, and Gila von Weitershausen.

The film's sets were designed by the art director Rolf Zehetbauer. Location shooting took place in Austrian Tyrol.

Cast

References

External links

1972 Western (genre) films
German Western (genre) films
West German films
Films directed by Harald Reinl
Films based on works by Jack London
Films scored by Gerhard Heinz
Northern (genre) films
Constantin Film films
1970s German-language films
1970s German films